Geissois stipularis is a species of forest trees, constituting part of the plant family Cunoniaceae. They are endemic to Fiji.

References

stipularis
Endemic flora of Fiji
Trees of Fiji
Endangered flora of Oceania
Taxonomy articles created by Polbot